The Merrie Melodies Show was an animated anthology television series released to syndication by Warner Bros. Television in 1972. Each half-hour episode featured three shorts from the Looney Tunes and Merrie Melodies library, primarily those produced after 1960 and featuring Speedy Gonzales, Sylvester and Daffy Duck.

This series is not to be confused with the Warners' later syndicated anthology Merrie Melodies Starring Bugs Bunny & Friends.

Episodes

References

American children's animated anthology television series
1970s American animated television series
1972 American television series debuts
1972 American television series endings
1970s American anthology television series
Looney Tunes television series
Television series by Warner Bros. Television Studios
English-language television shows